The .358 Winchester is a .35 caliber rifle cartridge based on a necked up .308 Winchester created by Winchester in 1955. The cartridge is also known in Europe as the 9.1x51mm.

History
This cartridge came over 30 years later than the .35 Whelen which is based on the .30-06 Springfield. The relationship in performance between the .358 Win and the .35 Whelen is similar to that between the .308 Win and the .30-06. It created a round more powerful than the .35 Remington and .348 Winchester.

Popularity of this cartridge has dwindled but Browning Arms Company still produces the Browning BLR in .358 and numerous other rifles, such as the Winchester Model 70, Winchester Model 88, and the Savage Model 99 are available on the used gun rack; a number of companies (see availability below) still produce the ammunition.  Noted web firearms author Chuck Hawks agrees with the Speer reloading manual that "the .358 Winchester is one of the best woods cartridges ever designed."

Performance and Availability

Cartridge cases can be formed from .308 cases.

See also
 List of rifle cartridges
 9 mm caliber
 Table of handgun and rifle cartridges

References

External links
Winchester's Sleeper. . .358 WCF, by Paco Kelly
Western Powders Handloading Guide Edition 8.0 Reloading info from Western Powders (p. 43)

358 Winchester
358 Winchester